Idalus albescens is a moth of the family Erebidae. It was described by Walter Rothschild in 1909. It is found in Suriname, Guyana and French Guiana.

References

 

albescens
Moths described in 1909